The 2002 Barangay Ginebra Kings season was the 24th season of the franchise in the Philippine Basketball Association (PBA).

Draft picks

Occurrences
Eric Menk was one of the 15 players chosen by national coach Jong Uichico to play for the Philippine men's basketball team in the 2002 Asian Games in Busan, South Korea. Ginebra head coach Allan Caidic was named among the national team's assistant coaches and taking over from the Ginebra bench to call the shots is assistant coach Cris Calilan.

Transactions

Roster

Elimination round

Games won

References

Barangay Ginebra San Miguel seasons
Barangay